The 2013–14 season was the 108th season in the Football League and 115th season overall of association football played by Derby County F.C., an English football club based in Derby, Derbyshire. Their tenth-place finish in the 2012–13 season meant it was their sixth consecutive season in the second tier, and their 46th overall.

Overview

Derby County played their league games in the Championship in the 2013–14 season, the fixtures were announced on 19 June 2013. The season began on 3 August 2013 and the regular season concluded on 3 May 2014. The season was extended because Derby competed in the play-offs which meant the season ended on 24 May 2014 in the 2013–14 play-off final.

Derby entered the League Cup in the first round, the draw for this was announced on 17 June 2014. They were drawn against Oldham away who they beat 1–0. In the second round they faced Brentford F.C., who they defeated 5–0. The team were out of the competition after losing 2–1 to Leicester City in the third round.

Derby entered the FA Cup at the third round stage. In the draw, they were picked to play Premier League side Chelsea at home

Pre-season
In early April 2013, it was confirmed by the club that ten youth team players had signed professional terms with Derby County. After completing two-year scholarships; goalkeeper Ross Etheridge, defenders Dylan Hayes, Sam Berry and Josh Lelan, midfielders Rhys Sharpe, Niall Dawkins, Andy Dales, Ayrton Wassall and attacker Adam Wixted were all given deals. First year scholar defender Jamie Hanson; who featured in matchday squads for the first team in the second half of the previous season was also offered terms. Nigel Clough also admitted interested in Blackpool's out of contract defender Alex Baptiste but dismissed interest in Motherwell's Jamaican international winger Chris Humphrey. Birmingham City winger Chris Burke, Burnley goalkeeper Lee Grant and Norwich City striker James Vaughan, the latter two who had previously played for the Rams, were also speculated as possible transfer targets.

Ahead of Derby's final League game of the previous season it was announced that veteran Welsh defender Gareth Roberts would be released in the summer after the expiration of his contract. Grant became the first signing of the summer, rejoining Derby on a three-year contract six years after he was released. Nigel Clough stated that Grant was signed as the new first choice goalkeeper, with Saul Deeney and Mats Mørch being second and third choice respectively, with Mørch set to feature for the under-21 side. Frank Fielding and Adam Legzdins were made available for transfer, whilst Ross Atkins was reported to be joining fellow Derbyshire outfit Alfreton Town on loan. Defenders Tom Naylor and James O'Connor, midfielder James Bailey and strikers Theo Robinson and Nathan Tyson were made available for transfer. Former loan player Chris Martin joined the club on a free transfer from Norwich City on a two-year contract. Midfielder Ben Davies extended his contract by a year. Contract talks were also underway with midfielder Craig Bryson, however Clough had fears that right-back John Brayford would join a Premier League club.

Towards the end of May, Derby released their retained list where Roberts' departure was confirmed, but Ross Atkins, Saul Deeney, Conor Doyle and Michael Hoganson were all give new one-year deals, with Atkins and Doyle being made available for loan. Bryson's contract talks ended with the Scotsman signing a new three-year contract. Derby had bid for Dundee United striker Johnny Russell with a bid being rejected in late May, however an improved offer of £750,000 was accepted in early June, with the player joining Derby on a four-year contract.

On 17 June, the first round draw of the League Cup was made, with Derby drawing League One outfit Oldham Athletic away. In mid-June, Derby accepted a fee for transfer-listed goalkeeper Frank Fielding from Bristol City of League One, a move which was confirmed a week later for a fee of around £200,000. At the end of the month, Wigan Athletic had a bid of £1m for John Brayford turned down. Two long-speculated transfers were confirmed at the start of July, with goalkeeper Ross Atkins joining Alfreton Town on loan and former loanee Craig Forsyth rejoing the club from Watford on a three-year contract for a reported fee of £150,000.

As the players reported back from the post-season break, the club confirmed that ex-Watford midfielder John Eustace, a player who had a previous loan spell at the Rams in 2009 and American college winger Marcus Selandy-Defour had before joined the club on trials. Conor Doyle, a player who struggled to break into the Derby team was linked with Major League Soccer's Colorado Rapids for a six-month loan, however the MLS rules on player registrations complicated the move. He later joined D.C. United on a loan until the start of December, when a buying option for D.C. lapses. Derby won their first pre-season game at Irish-based Bohemians 6–1 through a brace from Johnny Russell, with returning loanee Callum Ball, Ben Davies, Paul Coutts and Conor Sammon netting the other four in the second half. They then took on Port Vale with a "weaker" starting lineup according to Clough. Despite this, they took the lead in the second minute with a Michael Jacobs penalty. Vale scored three goals without reply in 30 minutes. Michael Hoganson and Jeff Hendrick both scored early in the second half to level the score, with Russell and Craig Forsyth scoring late in half to ensure a 5–3 Derby win. Derby kept their 100% pre-season record going with a 2–0 win at Bristol Rovers through goals from Jamie Ward and Russell, his fourth goal in three pre-season games. A Derby XI then beat non-league Buxton 4–1, with transfer-listed Theo Robinson scoring a hattrick. The following day, Selandy-Defour completed his trial and returned to America. On 23 July, Derby beat Burton Albion 2–0 with goals from Chris Martin and Conor Sammon. The following day, Eustace signed a one-year deal with the club. On 25 July, a £1.5 million bid from Premier League newcomers Cardiff City was accepted for right-back John Brayford, with move being completed the following day. Derby were denied a 100% pre-season record, after losing 2–0 at home in their final pre-season friendly to West Bromwich Albion. Tottenham Hotspur right-back Adam Smith joined the club on a season-long loan deal on 29 July. Striker Callum Ball joined League Two outfit Torquay United on a two-month youth loan.

August
A day before the fixture release day of 19 June, it was announced that Derby County would start their season with a match against Blackburn Rovers at Pride Park, as part of the Football League's 125th anniversary. Derby took the lead through a 43rd-minute penalty form debutant Johnny Russell after a handball from Alex Marrow, Leon Best scored a late equaliser on 89 minutes. In the first League Cup match of the season against Oldham, Derby made six changes from the previous league match and booked their place into the 2nd round for the first time in five years through a Michael Jacobs 20th-minute goal. Two days later in the second round draw, Derby draw another League One side; Brentford at home with the game being played in late August. Derby wouldn't have to wait long for their first league, as they won at Brighton & Hove Albion 2–1 in a come from behind win with a Chris Martin double, trumping a Leonardo Ulloa opener. Out of favour defender Tom Naylor joined League Two newcomers Newport County on loan until early January 2014. Transfer listed striker Theo Robinson let the club to join Doncaster Rovers for a fee of £150,000. Meanwhile, young Norwegian goalkeeper Mats Mørch joined Burton Albion on a months loan. Derby lost 1–0 at home to rivals Leicester City after a Lee Grant own goal. In late August, it was reported that out of favour defender James O'Connor was training with Bristol City of League One with the view of a permanent transfer. Derby however, won consecutive away games, after beating Yeovil Town 3–0 in the first meeting between the clubs through late first half goals from Johnny Russell and Craig Bryson, with Chris Martin rounding out the scoring on 58 minutes. Derby then scored a comfortable passage into the third round of the League Cup with goals from Chris Martin, Conor Sammon and Will Hughes in the first half and Sammon and Martin again in the second half to complete a 5–0 win. Derby then drew Leicester City away for the third round. However, the club's disappointing home league form continued with Derby's August programme finishing with a 3–0 defeat to Burnley through first half Danny Ings and Sam Vokes, with Johnny Russell having a penalty saved by Tom Heaton halfway through the second half, with Jason Shackell finishing the scoring for the visitors on 74 minutes. Derby ended the month 14th in the table on 7 points. Hendrick missed the game with after picking up chipped ankle bone injury in the Yeovil, with a scan revealing damage worse than expected and was later ruled out for 12 weeks.

September
On transfer deadline day, two of Derby's transfer listed players left the club, with James O'Connor on loan deal until 13 January with Bristol City, with a view to a permanent transfer. Nathan Tyson joined Blackpool on a free transfer. After the international break, Derby returned to league action with a visit to Millwall and with a 5–1 win, Derby won their opening three away league games for the first time in 101 years and it was also the first time they won on road for three games in succession since February 2004, Craig Bryson scored his first career hattrick in the game which was also Derby's first league hattrick by a player since Paul Simpson in April 1996. Jake Buxton opening the scoring, with Shane Lowry being sent off for serious foul play at 2–0, Martyn Waghorn got Millwall's goal to make it 3–1, Mason Bennett scored his first league goal late on to complete the scoring. Derby's winning run on the road ended three days later after a 2–2 draw at basement side Bolton Wanderers, with Alex Baptiste and Chris Eagles first half goals being sandwiched by a Johnny Russell brace.

Transfers
Last updated: 30 January 2014

Note: Flags indicate national team as has been defined under FIFA eligibility rules. Players may hold more than one non-FIFA nationality.

 1 = Loan terminated by mutual consent on 30 November 2013

First team squad
Ages and appearance stats correct as of final day of the season.
Last updated: 24 May 2014

League table

Results

Friendlies

Football League Championship

Championship play-offs

FA Cup

Football League Cup

Squad statistics

|}

Top scorers

Disciplinary Record

Under-21s

Results

Friendlies

Professional U21 Development League 2

U21 Premier League Cup

References

External links
 Derby County FC official website
 Derby County FC on Soccerbase

Derby County F.C. seasons
Derby County